Gartners Branch is a stream in Cooper County in the U.S. state of Missouri. It is a tributary of Stephens Branch.

The source of the name Gartners is obscure.

Pilot Grove is the closest census-designated place (CDP) to Gartners Branch.

See also
List of rivers of Missouri

References

Rivers of Cooper County, Missouri
Rivers of Missouri